Twofold Inc. is a 2016 puzzle video game for iOS and Android in which the player slides the game board to form color chains that can be removed with a single swipe. It was created by the Swedish indie developer Grapefrukt, who previously released Rymdkapsel. Multiple reviewers compared its endless puzzle gameplay to that of Threes.

Reception 

The game received "generally favorable" reviews, according to review aggregator Metacritic.

References

Further reading

External links 

 

2016 video games
IOS games
IOS-only games
Indie video games
Puzzle video games
Single-player video games
Video games developed in Sweden